The Alexandre Robert case concerns an incident of gang rape of a minor that occurred in 2007 in Dubai, United Arab Emirates.

This case was widely publicized in France and around the world and had consequences for diplomatic relations between France and the United Arab Emirates.

Incident
On 14 July 2007, Alexandre Robert, a 15-year-old French boy living in Dubai, was returning from the beach with his friend and, unable to find a taxi, decided to accept an offer of a ride from an acquaintance, a young Emirati man. This acquaintance called two of his friends, men aged 18 and 36, who came to pick them up by car. Alexandre and his friend entered the vehicle but soon realized that the car had passed the exit where he lived. When Robert enquired about where they were going, the men locked the doors of the car. They then drove the two friends towards open desert in the outskirts of the city. The men confiscated his cellphone and threatened to kill his family if he reported them. Alexandre's friend was then forcibly removed from the car before the three men gang raped Robert.

As they were about to leave, the assailants realized that their car was stuck in the sand. They telephoned for help, and a 4x4 arrived quickly. Robert managed to memorize the license plate of the 4x4, which later led to the arrest of the perpetrators.

Robert and his friend were then brought back to Dubai where they were hastily thrown out of the car in front of a luxury hotel. During the ride back to the city, Alexandre and his friend were repeatedly threatened that they would be raped again and killed if they tried to report them to the police.

Controversies

Minimization of the case by the Dubai authorities
This case shed light on part of the judicial system of the United Arab Emirates, particularly on the treatment reserved for rape cases and on the taboo of homosexuality in the country. According to Robert's father, they were received in a rather hostile way by the police who would have done everything to dissuade them from filing a complaint.

At the time of the medical examination, the doctor at the police station coaxed Robert to admit that he was homosexual and that the incident was not in fact a rape, but a consensual homosexual relationship between him and the three men. The medical report also suggested that Alexandre has "homosexual liabilities".

Dubai considers homosexuality a crime, with consensual sodomy punishable by up to 10 years in prison in Dubai. The concept of raping a man is also not widely recognised, with Dubai even preferring to talk about "forced homosexuality" rather than rape in these situations.

Alexandre's mother, Véronique Robert, was quickly made aware of the events. As a journalist, she used her networks and knowledge to ensure that her son's rape was not swept under the carpet by Emirati authorities. She hired a French-speaking Emirati lawyer and had her son undergo a series of medical tests, ensuring that the complaint was taken seriously. She also enlisted the help of the French authorities, in particular the French Consulate in Dubai. Véronique Robert then contacted the French government directly via the Quai d'Orsay and the Secretary General of the Elysée Palace, Claude Géant. During a meeting at the Elysée Palace in July 2007, French President Nicolas Sarkozy even asked his Emirati counterpart to give "the greatest attention" to the case.

Following the mobilisation of Alexandre's mother, their lawyer contacted the Dubai police so that they could take the young man's statement again, this time more seriously as it had not even been recorded. As a result of this new statement and the number plate that Robert provided them with, the police were able to arrest two of the rapists.

Concealment of blood results
The Dubai authorities initially announced to Alexander's family that the blood tests carried out on the three rapists had proved negative and that they were therefore not carriers of AIDS or other STDs. Shortly thereafter, contradictory information arrived and the family began to doubt the information and requested new medical tests. Once again they were told that the new tests were negative. It was later learned that the 32-year-old assailant had been carrying AIDS for several years and that he was well known to the Emirati authorities, who had even recommended that the man be locked up in a separate room when he was incarcerated. The Emirati authorities are said to have sought to hide this AIDS case, as the subject, like that of homosexuality, is very taboo in the country, which seeks to deny the existence of "the virus" on its territory.

Faced with this obvious concealment of information, Véronique Robert accused the Dubai authorities of having lied and endangered her son's life because during this time they have not been able to start a preventive tritherapy. She filed a complaint against the Attorney General, the two chiefs of police, the Sheikh of Dubai and Abu Dhabi for endangering her son's life.

Trial
In the first trial, two of the three rapists in the car were tried, the 18-year-old man and the 36-year-old man. They were accused of "kidnapping with deception" and "forced homosexuality", the latter charge being punishable by life imprisonment or the death penalty in Dubai.

The defendants pleaded not guilty and claimed that Robert had consented during the events. Their lawyers accused Robert of being homosexual, as homosexuality is a crime in Dubai. The third man, Robert's acquaintance who had offered him a ride and forced him into the car, was later judged by a court for minors.

Ultimately, the two adult men were sentenced to 15 years in prison each. Although Alexandre and his family were pleased that the men were convicted and that the crime did not go unpunished, they did not consider the sentence to be severe enough. In their opinion, the fact that the 36-year-old man had hidden his HIV status was an aggravating factor that should have resulted in a harsher sentence.

References

2007 in the United Arab Emirates
2007 controversies
Homophobia
Rape in the United Arab Emirates
Controversies in the United Arab Emirates
Law enforcement controversies
Rape trials
Dubai society